English electronic music group Clean Bandit have released two studio albums, two extended plays, 22 singles (including four as a featured artist), 22 music videos and 13 remixes. In December 2012, the group released their debut single "A+E", which peaked at number 100 on the UK Singles Chart. The song is the lead single from their debut album, New Eyes, which was released in May 2014. The album's second single, "Mozart's House", charted at number seventeen on the UK Singles Chart, becoming Clean Bandit's first top twenty single on the chart. "Dust Clears" was released as the third single from the album, reaching number forty-three on the UK chart. The album's fourth single, "Rather Be", features Jess Glynne and topped the UK Singles Chart, the group's first number one on the chart.

Clean Bandit's 2016 single "Rockabye", which features rapper Sean Paul and singer Anne-Marie, became their second number-one hit in the UK, becoming the Christmas number one single for 2016 in its seventh consecutive week at number one. The follow-up to "Rockabye", "Symphony", featured Zara Larsson and became their third UK number-one single. Their second album, What Is Love?, followed on 30 November 2018.

Studio albums

Extended plays

Singles

As lead artist

As featured artist

Music videos

Remixes

Songwriting and production credits

Notes

References 

Discographies of British artists
Electronic music discographies